Melanoleuca privernensis is a species of fungus in the Pluteaceae family.

External links

Tricholomataceae
Fungi of Europe